Ferghal Dubh Ó Gadhra, aka Father Nicholas Ó Gadhra O.S.A. (-after 5 June 1686) was an Irish cleric and scribe.

Biography

Ó Gadhra was the compiler of the O Gara Manuscript (now RIA MS 23 F 16), which he compiled at Antwerp and Lisle between 1655 and 1659. He "returned to Ireland some time before June 5th, 1686, at which date he certifies that he is safe and sound at Bannada {san mBeinn fhada\ county Sligo. In a colophon he craves the reader's indulgence for   errors and omissions, because he had never a teacher. Evidently his task was a labour of love."

See also

 Fearghal Ó Gadhra, patron of the Annals of the Four Masters

External links
 http://digitaFerghal Dubh Ó Gadhral.nls.uk/early-gaelic-book-collections/pageturner.cfm?id=76712788&mode=transcription
 http://www.vanhamel.nl/wiki/Dublin,_Royal_Irish_Academy,_MS_23_F_16
 http://sources.nli.ie/Record/MS_UR_068071/Details

Irish scribes
17th-century Irish writers
Religious leaders from County Mayo
People from County Sligo